Marginella anna is a species of sea snail, a marine gastropod mollusk in the family Marginellidae, the margin snails.

Description
The length of the shell attains 3.3 mm.

Distribution
This marine species occurs off Madagascar.

References

 Boyer F. & Rosado J. (2019). Révision du complexe Marginella anna Jousseaume, 1881 dans l'Océan Indien occidental. Xenophora Taxonomy. 23: 3–21
 Cossignani T. (2006). Marginellidae & Cystiscidae of the World. L'Informatore Piceno. 408pp

External links
 Jousseaume, F. (1881). Description de nouvelles coquilles. Bulletin de la Société zoologique de France. 6: 172–188

anna
Fauna of the Red Sea
Gastropods described in 1881